Esther Cleveland (September 9, 1893 – June 25, 1980) was the second child of Grover Cleveland, 22nd and 24th President of the United States, and his wife Frances Folsom Cleveland.

Biography
She was born on September 9, 1893, in the White House. She remains the only child of a President to have been born there. Into her maturity, the US press still referred to her as "The White House baby" (in a photograph of her in her early 20s, from a now unknown newspaper archive source).

In April 1896, she contracted measles when it spread through the White House, leading to a quarantine. Five years later, she contracted diphtheria.

She made her debut in 1912 and was rumored to be engaged to Randolph D. West shortly after (which was denied by her relatives). On March 14, 1918, at Westminster Abbey, she married Captain William Sidney Bence Bosanquet (May 9, 1883 – March 5, 1966) of the Coldstream Guards of the British Army. He had liaised with the US over steel production and was the son of Sir Albert Bosanquet, the Common Serjeant of London. After WWII he was the manager of Skinningrove Iron Works in East Cleveland, England. Following his death, she returned to the United States. They lived in Kirkleatham Old Hall, now Kirkleatham Museum, on the outskirts of Redcar. They bought the whole building in 1930 after half of it was initially occupied by soldiers. She sold the house to the local Council in 1970.

As Mrs Bosanquet, she was known locally in the 1940s and 1950s for her philanthropy. Esther bridged the divergent views of her mother's opposition to suffrage, stemming from Frances Cleveland's belief that women were not ready to vote, through to supporting her daughter who went to Somerville College, Oxford. She was the mother of British philosopher Philippa Foot, who was a fellow at Oxford before holding several professorships in the States. Philippa Foot clearly had a sense of liberation from early governess education to high academic success. She said that she learned nothing from home tuition in Kirkleatham. It was "the sort of milieu where there was a lot of hunting, shooting, and fishing, and where girls simply did not go to college." Nevertheless, she had the subsequent financial support from Esther and William Bosanquet to go to school in Ascot and later to Oxford.

Esther Cleveland Bosanquet died in Tamworth, New Hampshire, in 1980 at age 86.

References

1893 births
1980 deaths
19th-century American women
20th-century American women
Children of presidents of the United States
Cornell family
Grover Cleveland family
People from Washington, D.C.